Montalbert (1350m) is a village situated on the flanks of Mont Jovet, a 2558m peak overlooking the Tarentaise (Isere) valley in Savoie, a department of the Auvergne-Rhone-Alpes region. It was originally a farming hamlet, but since the first lifts were built in the 1970s, it has evolved into a dedicated holiday resort. It now has few permanent residents, with most seasonal workers preferring to live in other nearby settlements, such as Longefoy. It remains an attractive village, with an old chapel at its centre.

It now caters for visitors during the winter ski season - usually from Christmas to early April, and in July and August. In the summer the main lift operates from Monday to Friday to cater for hikers and mountain bikers. For the 2016/17 winter season, a one-week lift pass covering the entire La Plagne domain will cost 260 Euros. A one-week summer pass in 2016 cost 25 Euros. Local shops provide ski and board hire in Winter, while mountain bikes and climbing gear can be rented in Summer.

Montalbert links to the rest of the La Plagne ski domain via two ski lifts. The first of these is a rapid cable car/bubble, which was installed in the summer of 2015. From the 2016/17 season a new chairlift (Les Envers) will provide a rapid link to Aime 2000, part of the main La Plagne ski area. The slopes above Montalbert are North-facing and therefore retain their snow-cover well. The area also has an extensive snow cannon network.

Montalbert markets itself primarily at families and it caters for an international clientele. The ski school is run by ESF ( Ecole de Ski Francais) and they offer lessons from the age of 3 years and up. Accommodation is mainly self-catering apartments and chalets, although there are also catered chalets as well. Several of the developments are relatively new, but have been built in a 'Savoyarde' chalet style in an effort to blend in with their surroundings. 

There are numerous restaurants in the village, most of them serving variations of local Savoyarde cuisine (e.g. raclette, fondue, tartiflette), as well as a couple of pizza outlets. There is a small supermarket which sells fresh bread and a wide variety of produce during the holiday seasons, although its prices are rather high. Nightlife is limited when compared to bigger resorts, though there are several bars which are open into the early hours.

Montalbert is about 200 km from Lyon Airport, 240 km from Geneva, 100 km from Chambéry Airport and 160 km from Grenoble Airport. High speed trains connecting the UK and Europe also stop at Aime-La-Plagne which is about 10 km away

External links
Webcam
 http://www.mountainheaven.co.uk
 http://www.ski-montalbert.co.uk
 http://www.montalbert.info 
 http://www.skiamis.com
 http://www.frenchskichaletforsale.com

Ski areas and resorts in France
Tourist attractions in Savoie